Bradley Lee Daugherty (born October 19, 1965), nicknamed  "Big Dukie" and "The Hooch", is an American former professional basketball player, analyst, and co-owner of NASCAR Cup Series team JTG Daugherty Racing. He played college basketball for the North Carolina Tar Heels and professionally with the Cleveland Cavaliers of the National Basketball Association (NBA).

Amateur career
Daugherty played basketball at Charles D. Owen High School in Black Mountain, North Carolina, where he led the Warhorses to the 1982 state finals. Daugherty accepted a scholarship to play at the University of North Carolina under legendary college basketball coach Dean Smith.

Daugherty was one of the greatest big men ever to play at the University of North Carolina. He entered college as a 16-year-old freshman and was a two-time All-ACC first team selection, and a first team All-American in 1986. He was named to the ACC 50th Anniversary men's basketball team in 2002 and was inducted into the North Carolina Sports Hall of Fame. Daugherty averaged more than twenty points per game in his senior season.

Professional career

Cleveland Cavaliers (1986–1996) 
Daugherty was taken as the first overall pick by the Cleveland Cavaliers in the 1986 NBA draft. Cleveland had obtained the rights to the first pick in a trade with the Philadelphia 76ers for Roy Hinson and cash. The Cavaliers also drafted Ron Harper with the eighth pick in the 1986 draft and obtained the rights to Mark Price (in a trade with the Dallas Mavericks) the 25th pick (second round). Harper, Price and Daugherty, along with fellow rookie John "Hot Rod" Williams immediately began to pay dividends for Cleveland. Daugherty, Williams, and Harper were all named to the 1986–87 All-Rookie team.

Daugherty averaged nineteen points and ten rebounds per game over eight seasons in the NBA and retired as the Cavaliers all-time leading scorer (10,389 points) and rebounder (5,227). Daugherty's all time-leading scorer record stood until March 21, 2008, when LeBron James broke the point record against the Toronto Raptors. His leading rebounder record stood until December 9, 2008, when Žydrūnas Ilgauskas broke the rebound record, again against the Raptors. He played in 41 postseason games and led the Cavaliers as far as the Eastern Conference Finals in 1992. Brad was a five time All-Star (1988, 1989, 1991, 1992, 1993). As part of the Cavaliers' 30th anniversary in 1999–2000, Daugherty was a unanimous selection to the All-Time Cleveland Cavalier team.

Daugherty's career in the NBA was cut short at the age of 28 because of recurring back troubles. He never played another game after the 1993–94 season, though he did make one appearance in uniform for the Whoopi Goldberg movie Eddie along with teammates Hot Rod Williams, John Battle, Terrell Brandon, and Bobby Phills. After two consecutive seasons of inactivity, he announced his retirement after the 1995–96 season. His #43 jersey, a number he picked as a tribute to NASCAR legend Richard Petty (whom Daugherty lists as his favorite sportsman) was retired by the Cavaliers on March 1, 1997.

NBA career statistics

Regular season

|-
| align="left" | 1986–87
| align="left" | Cleveland
| 80 || 80 || 33.7 || .538 || .000 || .696 || 8.1 || 3.8 || 0.6 || 0.8 || 15.7
|-
| align="left" | 1987–88
| align="left" | Cleveland
| 79 || 78  || 37.4 || .510 || .000 || .716 || 8.4 || 4.2 || 0.6 || 0.7 || 18.7
|-
| align="left" | 1988–89
| align="left" | Cleveland
| 78 || 78 || 36.2 || .538 || .333 || .737 || 9.2 || 3.7 || 0.8 || 0.5 || 18.9
|-
| align="left" | 1989–90
| align="left" | Cleveland
| 41 || 40 || 35.1 || .479 || .000 || .704 || 9.1 || 3.2 || 0.7 || 0.5 || 16.8
|-
| align="left" | 1990–91
| align="left" | Cleveland
| 76 || 76 || 38.8 || .524 || .000 || .751 || 10.9 || 3.3 || 1.0 || 0.6 || 21.6
|-
| align="left" | 1991–92
| align="left" | Cleveland
| 73 || 73 || 36.2 || .570 || .000 || .777 || 10.4 || 3.6 || 0.9 || 1.1 || 21.5
|-
| align="left" | 1992–93
| align="left" | Cleveland
| 71 || 71 || 37.9 || .571 || .500 || .795 || 10.2 || 4.4 || 0.7 || 0.8 || 20.2 
|-
| align="left" | 1993–94
| align="left" | Cleveland
| 50 || 50 || 36.8 || .488 || .000 || .785 || 10.2 || 3.0 || 0.8 || 0.7 || 17.0

|- class=sortbottom
| style="text-align:center;" colspan=2| Career
| 548 || 546 || 36.5 || .532 || .143 || .747 || 9.5 || 3.7 || 0.8 || 0.7 || 19.0 
|-

Playoffs

|-
|style="text-align:left;"|1988
|style="text-align:left;"|Cleveland
|5||5||40.8||.460||.000||.677||9.2||3.2||0.4||1.4||15.8
|-
|style="text-align:left;"|1989
|style="text-align:left;"|Cleveland
|5||5||33.4||.362||.000||.600||9.2||2.4||1.2||1.0||11.0
|-
|style="text-align:left;"|1990
|style="text-align:left;"|Cleveland
|5||5||37.2||.586||.000||.696||9.6||4.0||0.4||0.8||22.8
|-
|style="text-align:left;"|1992
|style="text-align:left;"|Cleveland
|17||17||40.4||.528||.000||.814||10.2||3.4||0.6||1.0||21.5
|-
|style="text-align:left;"|1993
|style="text-align:left;"|Cleveland
|9||9||39.6||.557||.000||.800||11.7||3.4||0.7||0.8||18.7
|-
|- class="sortbottom"
| style="text-align:center;" colspan="2" | Career
|41||41||39.0||.519||.000||.756||10.2||3.3||0.7||1.0||19.1
|}

Post-basketball career
Daugherty's business interests include car dealerships, waste management and commercial real estate. He is also a college basketball analyst and was a NASCAR broadcaster for ESPN. For one season, he was a color commentator, alongside Michael Reghi, for Cleveland Cavaliers telecasts. He is active in many charities including hosting the Presbyterian Home for Children's annual golf tournament, which raises money in support of the home, located in Black Mountain. He also has sponsored an annual scholarship to help a child from Presbyterian Home receive a higher education. At UNC, he has given to the Sonja Haynes Stone Center for Black Culture and History and has served on the Board of Visitors and the athletic council of the General Alumni Association Board.

Following his retirement from the NBA, Daugherty co-owned a NASCAR Camping World Truck Series team (Liberty Racing) featuring such drivers as Kenny Irwin Jr. and Kevin Harvick. In 1997 Irwin won two Craftsman Truck Series races driving for Daugherty (Homestead-Miami Speedway in March and Texas Motor Speedway in June). Daugherty joined ESPN's return to NASCAR racing telecasts in 2007.  He was an analyst on the weekly topical show Inside NASCAR on Showtime, and on NASCAR Now, a nightly newscast on the sport.  He is also part owner of JTG Daugherty Racing, which owns the No. 47 Camaro ZL1 1LE driven by Ricky Stenhouse Jr. The team's first win came in 2014 at Watkins Glen International with A.J. Allmendinger driving the No. 47 Chevrolet. Their second win came in the  2023 Daytona 500 with Ricky Stenhouse Jr. winning. With the win, Daugherty became the first black principal owner to win the Daytona 500.

In November of 2014, Daugherty began as an NBA and college basketball analyst for ESPN.

After years of animosity for the team's handling of his close friend and former General Manager Wayne Embry, Daugherty joined Fox Sports Ohio for select Cavaliers telecasts in the 2019–20 season as part of the franchise's 50th season celebration.

On July 28, 2020, Daugherty became an analyst for NASCAR on NBC from the first Michigan International Speedway race onwards. Daugherty also served as a roaming reporter for CBS Sports coverage of the 2021 SRX Series.

On August 20, 2020, Daugherty represented the Cleveland Cavaliers in the 2020 NBA Draft Lottery.

Daugherty is currently a part of the Cavaliers broadcast team alongside his NASCAR team ownership.

References

External links
nba.com/historical/playerfile
NBA.com profile
Brad Daugherty ESPN Bio
Career stats at basketball-reference.com
 "From Basketball to Business" Asheville-Citizen Times interview, June 15, 2008

1965 births
Living people
African-American basketball players
African-American Christians
African-American motorsport people
African-American television personalities
All-American college men's basketball players
American men's basketball players
American Presbyterians
American television sports announcers
Basketball players from North Carolina
Cleveland Cavaliers draft picks
Cleveland Cavaliers players
College basketball announcers in the United States
Centers (basketball)
McDonald's High School All-Americans
Motorsport announcers
NASCAR team owners
National Basketball Association All-Stars
National Basketball Association broadcasters
National Basketball Association players with retired numbers
North Carolina Tar Heels men's basketball players
Parade High School All-Americans (boys' basketball)
People from Black Mountain, North Carolina
21st-century African-American people
20th-century African-American sportspeople